Cycling has been contested at every Summer Paralympic Games since the 1984 Summer Paralympics.

Summary

Classification

Cyclists are given a classification depending on the type and extent of their disability. The classification system allows cyclists to compete against others with a similar level of function.

At the 2008 Summer Paralympics and earlier, classes were:
B&VI 1–3: Cyclists with a visual impairment, using a tandem bicycle
LC 1–4: Cyclists with a locomotor disability, including those with amputations
CP 1–4: Cyclists with cerebral palsy, using a tricycle (CP 1–2) or bicycle (CP 3–4)
HC A, B, and C: Cyclists using a handcycle

At the 2012 Summer Paralympics, a functional para-cycling classification system was used.
B: Cyclists with a vision impairment, using a tandem bicycle
T 1–2: Cyclists with cerebral palsy, MS or similar neuro-motor impairment, using a tricycle
C 1–5: Cyclists with amputations, neuromotor or musculoskeletal impairment, using a bicycle
H 1–4: Cyclists using a handcycle

Factoring

In some cycling events, cyclists with different classifications compete against each other for one set of medals. Many (but not all) such events are factored, reducing the times of riders in lower classifications to take their greater impairment into account. Factoring percentages are based on average race times by riders in each classification.

At the 2012 Summer Paralympics, factored races included the mixed tricycle time trial, Women's C1–3 road time trial, Women's H1–2 road time trial and track C1–3 and C4–5 events.

Road cycling

Men's events

Women's events

Mixed events

Medal table

Track cycling

Men's events

Women's events

Mixed events

Medal table

Overall medal table

Updated to 2020 Summer Paralympics. Countries in italics are former countries who participated in the Paralympics.

Nations

See also
 Cycling at the Summer Olympics
 Cycle sport
 Para-cycling
 Para-cycling classification
 UCI Para-cycling Road World Championships 
 UCI Para-cycling Track World Championships

References

IPC Historical Results Database - General Search, International Paralympic Committee (IPC)

 
Paralympics
Sports at the Summer Paralympics